Sardeh Band or Sardeband is a town located on the eastern edge of Andar District, Ghazni Province, Afghanistan, near the border with Paktika Province. The town is located near the Sardeh Band Dam. The Sardeh Band Airport is located in the town.

Notable people
Abdul Ahad Mohmand, Afghan astronaut

See also 
 Loya Paktia

References 

Populated places in Ghazni Province